Dunluce Upper is a barony in County Antrim, Northern Ireland. It is bordered by six other baronies: Dunluce Lower to the north; Cary to the north-east; North East Liberties of Coleraine to the north-west; Coleraine to the west; Kilconway to the south; and Glenarm Lower to the east. Dunluce Upper also formed part of the medieval territory known as the Route.

History

List of settlements
Below is a list of settlements in Dunluce Upper:

Towns
Ballymoney

Population centres
Corkey
Glenbush
Loughguile (part in barony of Kilconway)

List of civil parishes
Below is a list of civil parishes in Dunluce Upper:
Armoy (split with barony of Cary)
Ballymoney (also partly in barony of Kilconway, County Antrim and North East Liberties of Coleraine, County Londonderry)
Killagan (split with barony of Kilconway)
Kilraghts
Loughguile (split with barony of Kilconway)

References